Tapan Maity (born 1984) is an Indian football player. He is currently playing for Prayag United in the I-League in India as a left midfielder. Before joining Prayag united he played for Mohammedan sporting, ONGC FC, Air India FC, and Maidan giants Mohun Bagan.

External links
 http://goal.com/en-india/people/india/21519/tapan-maity
 

Indian footballers
1984 births
Living people
I-League players
ONGC FC players
Mohammedan SC (Kolkata) players
United SC players
Bharat FC players
Indian Super League players
FC Pune City players
Footballers from Kolkata
Association football midfielders